Xiuhtezcatl Roske-Martinez (born May 9, 2000), also known by the initial X, is an American environmental activist and hip hop artist. Martinez was formerly the Youth Director of Earth Guardians until 2019.

Martinez has spoken about the effects of fossil fuels on indigenous and other marginalized communities. He has spoken at the United Nations several times, and he gained popularity after delivering a 2015 speech at the United Nations General Assembly in English, Spanish and his native language, Nahuatl.

Martinez is one of 21 plaintiffs involved in Juliana v. United States, a lawsuit filed against the U.S. government for failing to act on climate change. The lawsuit was filed in 2015, and a federal court rejected the government's move to dismiss the case in November 2016. Martinez is also one of seven plaintiffs in the Martinez v. Colorado Oil and Gas Conservation Commission case; that case is a state-level lawsuit similar to Juliana v. United States.

Family
Martinez was born in Colorado, but moved to Mexico in his infancy. He lived with his family in Boulder, Colorado through 2019 moving later to Portland, Oregon. His mother, Tamara Roske, was one of the founders of the Earth Guardian Community Resource Center, a high school in Maui, Hawaii. Roske served as Executive Director of Earth Guardians until May 2021. Martinez has two younger siblings, sister Tonantzin, and brother Itzcuauhtli. His father, Siri Martinez, is of Aztec heritage, and he has raised his children in the tradition of the Mexica (one of the native peoples of México). His family has transferred the traditional knowledge of seeing an individual as part of a greater whole, and of emphasizing a connection between all aspects of the natural world.  Therefore, Martinez sees abuse of nature as "the tearing apart of a fragile and revered system".

Activism

As a teenager, Martinez gave TED talks and was invited to speak before the United Nations on environmental policy. In June 2015, he spoke at the age of 15 in English, Spanish, and Nahuatl before the UN General Assembly on Climate Change. Martinez urged immediate climate action saying, "What's at stake right now is the existence of my generation."

That same year, he competed with young musicians from around the world who submitted self-produced music "to inspire the negotiations" at the United Nations Framework Convention on Climate Change with their music; Martinez's selection "Speak for the Trees" was chosen as the Jury Award Winner.

Martinez asserts that education and young people are key elements of the movement for significant social and environmental change: "The marching in the streets, the lifestyle changes haven't been enough so something drastic needs to happen. The change that we need is not going to come from a politician, from an orangutan in office, it's going to come from something that's always been the driver of change – people power, power of young people." When addressing the criticism of young people overusing technology in a 2016 interview with Bill Maher, Martinez noted that technology also brings people together to focus on a shared concern: "I think it's an important tool that we have for networking and connecting with people. Social media and technology – it's either a downfall and distraction for our generation, or a powerful tool we can use."

Earth Guardians 
Earth Guardians is an environmental activist organization founded in 1992. Martinez served as the Youth Director through 2019, transitioning to co-Youth Director alongside Marlow Baines, who assumed the youth leadership role in 2020. Earth Guardians' mission is to "inspire and train diverse youth to be effective leaders in the environmental, climate and social justice movements. Through the power of art, music, storytelling, civic engagement, and legal action, we're creating impactful solutions to some of the most critical issues we face as a global community." They work to organize climate strikes, cultivate environmentally focused policy, and encourage individual activism through promoting voting registration.

Climate change lawsuits
In 2015, Martinez and 21 other youths filed a lawsuit against the US Federal government, Juliana et al. v United States et al. They argue that the federal government is denying their constitutional right to life, liberty and property by ignoring climate change. The plaintiffs also included parties from the fossil fuel industry as defendants in the lawsuit, but said parties were removed as defendants during pre-trial proceedings. The plaintiffs range in age from 9 to 20 and ten of the children have either Black or Indigenous backgrounds. The lawsuit was launched while Obama was still in office, but in 2017 the plaintiffs substituted Trump's name for that of the former president.

In 2018, he and 13 other youths filed another lawsuit, this time against the state government of Colorado. He is the lead plaintiff in this Martinez v. Colorado Oil and Gas Conservation Commission case. The lawsuit was dismissed by King County Superior Court Judge Michael Scott on January 14, 2019, with the caveat, that the plaintiff and all other companies undertaking the same business of fossil fuel development and production follow the law and its intent, as laid out in the Colorado Oil and Gas Conservation Act (COGCA), which says that the Commission is required "(1) to foster the development of oil and gas resources, protecting and enforcing the rights of owners and producers, and (2) in doing so, to prevent and mitigate significant adverse environmental impacts to the extent necessary to protect public health, safety, and welfare, but only after taking into consideration cost-effectiveness and technical feasibility". Subsection 2 of the COGCA, is thought to be a possible target for future lawsuits and legislative changes, as in the case where local production costs overshoot regional costs or in the case where the public will turn away from local fossil fuel development and production. These factors coupled with decreased demand for fossil fuels are being closely watched by various think tanks and industry and environmental watchdog groups for the next steps in what may be a dynamic set of legal challenges within the state of Colorado. 

In December 2018, Remezcla named Martinez in their list of "30 Latinxs Who Made an Impact in Their Communities in 2018".

Political endorsements
In April 2019, Martinez wrote an op-ed in Teen Vogue endorsing Bernie Sanders for president, stating, "I believe Bernie Sanders has our back on climate change". In December 2018, Martinez spoke with Sanders at a town hall event called "Solving the Climate Crisis".

Music career 

Martinez along with his brother and sister formed a musical group. Their first album, Generation Ryse, was released in August 2014, and it includes eco hip-hop tracks like "What the Frack" and "Speak for the Trees". Through his music, he has highlighted specific environmental issues relevant to his state (Colorado) and facing the entire nation. Additionally, the album was aimed at today's youth in hopes of spreading their message of environmental awareness to their own generation.

Martinez released his first solo album, Break Free, in the spring of 2018, featuring songs like "Sage Up" and "Young". He worked with artists such as Nakho, Shailene Woodley, and Tru along with his younger sister, who is featured in most of his music, Tonantzin Martinez.

Awards 
Martinez was awarded the U.S. Volunteer Service Award by President Barack Obama in 2013. In 2017, he was included on Rolling Stone's "25 under 25 list"' of young people who will change the world. In 2018, he received a Generation Change Award at the MTV Europe Music Awards.

Books 
Imaginary Borders (Penguin Workshop Pocket Change Collective 2020)
We Rise: The Earth Guardians Guide to Building a Movement That Restores the Planet (Rodale Books 2017)

Filmography 
In 2021, he appeared as one of the activists in the French documentary film Bigger Than Us.

See also
Climate change mitigation

Notes

References

External links

 
 
 TEDx talk
 United Nations speech
 Real Time with Bill Maher interview
 "Kid Warrior: The Xiuhtezcatl Martinez Story"

2000 births
Living people
American activists
Hip hop activists
Hispanic and Latino American rappers
Musicians from Boulder, Colorado
Native American environmentalists
Native American rappers
21st-century American rappers
American child activists
American people of Indigenous Mexican descent
Youth climate activists